Imantocera penicillata is a species of beetle in the family Cerambycidae. It was described by Hope in 1831, originally under the genus Lamia. It is known from Bangladesh, Bhutan, India, Myanmar, China,  Thailand, Laos, Nepal, and Vietnam.

References

Lamiini
Beetles described in 1831